Plique-à-jour (French for "letting in daylight") is a vitreous enamelling technique where the enamel is applied in cells, similar to cloisonné, but with no backing in the final product, so light can shine through the transparent or translucent enamel. The technique is similar to that of cloisonné, but using a temporary backing that after firing is dissolved by acid or rubbed away. A different technique relies solely on surface tension, for smaller areas. In Japan the technique is known as shotai-jippo (shotai shippo), and is found from the 19th century on.

History
The technique was developed in the Byzantine Empire in 6th century AD. Some examples of Byzantine plique-à-jour survived in Georgian icons. The technique of plique-à-jour was adopted by Kievan Russia (a strong trading partner of Constantinople) with other enamel techniques. Despite its complexity plique-à-jour tableware (especially "kovsh" bowls) was used by its aristocracy. Russian masters significantly developed plique-à-jour technique: in addition to cells cut in precious metal they worked with cells made of silver wire. Unfortunately the plique-à-jour technique of Kievan Russia was lost after the crushing Mongol invasion in the 13th century. Some surviving examples are exhibited in the Historical Museum in Moscow.

Western Europe adopted the plique-à-jour technique (cells cut in metal) of Byzantium. The term smalta clara ("clear enamel"), probably meaning plique-à-jour appears in 1295 in the inventory of Pope Boniface VIII and the French term itself appears in inventories from the 14th century onwards. Benvenuto Cellini (1500–1571) gives a full description of the process in his Treatises of Benvenuto Cellini on Gold-smithing and Sculpture of 1568. Pre-19th century pieces are extremely rare because of their "extreme fragility ... which increases greatly with their size", and the difficulty of the technique.  Survivals "are almost exclusively small ornamental pieces". The outstanding early examples that survive are "the decorative insets in the early fifteenth-century Mérode Cup (Burgundian cup) at the Victoria and Albert Museum in London, a Swiss early sixteenth-century plique-à-jour enamel plaque representing the family of the Virgin Mary in the Metropolitan Museum of Art in New York, and the eight pinnacle points over the front of the eleventh-century Saint Stephen's Crown in Hungary". The technique was lost in both Western and Eastern Europe.

The technique was revived in the late 19th century movement of revivalist jewellery, and became especially popular in Russia and Scandinavia. Works by Pavel Ovchinikov, Ivan Khlebnikov, and some masters working for Faberge are real masterpieces of plique-à-jour. Russian masters predominately worked with tableware. Norwegian jewellers included David Andersen and J. Tostrup in Oslo, and Martin Hummer in Bergen. Art Nouveau artists such as René Lalique, Lucien Gaillard and other French and German artists predominantly used plique-à-jour in small jewellery, though the Victoria & Albert Museum has a tray of 1901 by Eugène Feuillâtre (1870–1916).

Currently plique-à-jour is not often used, because it is challenging technically and mainly because of breaks in transferring skills from one generation of jewellers to the next. However, some luxury houses do produce limited numbers of products in the plique-à-jour technique, for example Tiffany in jewellery, and Bulushoff in jewellery and tableware. Works in the shotai shippo technique are also known from China and Iran.

Techniques

There are four basic ways of creating plique-à-jour:

1. Filigree plique-à-jour ("Russian plique-à-jour"): This is a building up process whereby a planned design is interpreted using gold or silver wires which are worked over a metal form (e.g. a bowl). Wires are twisted or engraved, i.e. have additional micro patterns. The wires are soldered together. Enamels are ground and applied to each "cell" created by the metal wirework. The piece is fired in a kiln. This process of placing and firing the enamels is repeated until all cells are completely filled. Usually it takes up to 15–20 repeats.

2. Pierced plique-à-jour ("Western plique-à-jour"): A sheet of gold or silver is pierced and sawed, cutting out a desired design. This leaves empty spaces or "cells" to fill with enamel powders (ground glass).

3. Shotai shippo ("Japanese plique-à-jour"): A layer of flux (clear enamel) is fired over a copper form. Wires are fired onto the flux (similar to cloisonné) and the resulting areas are enameled in the colors of choice. When all the enameling is finished, the copper base is etched away leaving a translucent shell of plique-à-jour.

4. Cloisonné on mica: Cells in precious metal are covered with fixed mica, which is removed by abrasives after enameling.

Process for cloisonné plique-à-jour on mica

Sample process

Notes

References
Campbell, Marian. An Introduction to Medieval Enamels, 1983, HMSO for V&A Museum, 
Ostoia, Vera K., "A Late Mediaeval Plique-à-Jour Enamel", The Metropolitan Museum of Art Bulletin, New Series, Vol. 4, No. 3 (Nov. 1945), pp. 78–80, JSTOR

External links 
 

Artistic techniques
Vitreous enamel